The Hotel San Carlos branch in Phoenix, Arizona, also known as San Carlos Hotel, is both an operating hotel and tourist site. It has been associated with ghost sightings.  It was listed on the National Register of Historic Places (NRHP) in 1983 as San Carlos Hotel. Hotel San Carlos is a member of Historic Hotels of America, the official program of the National Trust for Historic Preservation

Legend 
Many employees have said that they have seen ghosts at the hotel, the most commonly mentioned being that of Leone Jensen. This caused the Travel Channel to dedicate part of their show World Travels to the hotel. This feature on the hotel was premiered on Monday, January 19, 2004. Whether the ghost sighting  theory is a promotional stunt is debatable.

Historical facts 

The site where the hotel sits was the location of the first school in Phoenix. The 4-room adobe school was inaugurated in 1874 and was replaced with a larger structure in 1879. The school was enlarged several times in subsequent years but was condemned in 1916, with construction of a luxury hotel in mind. In addition, many area children died during the 1918 Spanish flu epidemic that attacked the United States.

In 1919, the land was bought by the Babbitt family (relatives of Bruce Babbitt, former Arizona Governor and Secretary of the Interior), who intended to build a hotel. The San Carlos Hotel project was finally begun by Charles Harris and Dwight D. Heard who purchased the property from the Babbitts. Harris and Heard formed the Hotel San Carlos Company and construction began in 1927. The hotel was designed by nationally known architect George Whitecross Richie in the Italian Renaissance style. Construction was undertaken by Kinnie & Westerhouse General Contractors. The hotel was state of the art with air conditioning (the first in Phoenix), elevators, circulating chilled water in the rooms and steam heat. The hotel grand opening was on March 19, 1928. The hotel was built at a cost of nearly $850,000. Charles Harris was the co-owner and managing partner of the San Carlos, and took over full-time management of the San Carlos after the original manager, Dwight Heard, died in 1929. Harris moved his family into the roof-top bungalow (or penthouse) and worked diligently to keep the San Carlos Hotel open during the Great Depression. The hotel remained in the Harris family until 1967 when Harris' widow, Elsie, sold the property to an investment group. The investment group was unsuccessful and in 1970 sold the San Carlos to Gregory Melikian.  Over the past 43 years, Melikian and his family have owned, operated and lovingly restored the San Carlos Hotel to its original splendor.  The Melikian family has been instrumental in saving many historic properties in Phoenix.

The hotel competed with the posh Westward Ho hotel completed nearby the following year, which was located on the site of what once was Phoenix's first radio transmitter and whose list of clientele include such celebrities as Jack Dempsey and John F. Kennedy. The San Carlos had its share of celebrities such as Mae West, Clark Gable, Carole Lombard, Marilyn Monroe and Gene Autry.

On May 7, 1928, The Arizona Republic reported the death of Leone Jensen at the hotel. The article's headline read "Pretty blonde jumps from (the) San Carlos (hotel) early today." Based on what she wrote in her suicide note, it was believed the 22-year-old woman was physically abused by her boyfriend, a bellboy at the Westward Ho. Speculations have been made regarding whether Jensen was pregnant and/or her boyfriend was having an affair with another hotel worker. Because of these theories, the way she died is also debated. While most evidence pointed to suicide, others postulated she could have been pushed by her boyfriend or her boyfriend's other girlfriend. There have been numerous reports of sitings of Leone Jensen's ghost at the hotel.

Another ghost frequently mentioned by hotel employees is a little girl, possibly around six to nine years old, who is rumored to visit hotel rooms at night and sit crying. Believers think she was probably one of the area children affected either by the school's closing or the flu epidemic.

On December 9, 2004, yet another death occurred at the San Carlos, when an unidentified man jumped from the hotel's roof.

The Hotel San Carlos in Phoenix, a member of Historic Hotels of America, a program of the National Trust for Historic Preservation, underwent a $1-million remodel in 2003 and work continues on the historic boutique hotel. The hotel faces stiff competition from such five-star hotels as The Phoenician, Arizona Biltmore Hotel the Ritz Carlton, many Hilton Hotels and the Hyatt Regency Phoenix. However, as downtown Phoenix continues its dramatic growth the Hotel San Carlos remains a popular tourist destination in the heart of downtown Phoenix, six blocks from Chase Field (home of the Arizona Diamondbacks), five blocks from Talking Stick Resort Arena (home of the Phoenix Suns), and less than three blocks from the Dodge Theatre, Symphony Hall Phoenix, Orpheum Theatre, the Phoenix Convention Center and the Herberger Performing Arts Center.

The hotel can be briefly seen in the opening shot of Alfred Hitchcock's 1960 film Psycho as the camera pans the skyline of downtown Phoenix.

See also
 National Register of Historic Places listings in Yuma County, Arizona – for the San Carlos Hotel in Yuma, also on the NRHP in Arizona
 List of historic properties in Phoenix
 Phoenix Historic Property Register

References

External links

 Official Hotel San Carlos website

Hotels in Arizona
Buildings and structures in Phoenix, Arizona
Hotel buildings completed in 1928
1928 establishments in Arizona
Hotel buildings on the National Register of Historic Places in Arizona
National Register of Historic Places in Phoenix, Arizona
Renaissance Revival architecture in Arizona
Historic Hotels of America